The Very Best of Slim Whitman is a compilation album by Slim Whitman, released in 1976 on United Artists Records.

It spent six weeks at number one on the UK singles chart.

Track listing 
The album was issued in the UK by United Artists Records as a 12-inch long-playing record, catalog number UAS 29898.

Charts

References 

1976 compilation albums
Slim Whitman albums
United Artists Records compilation albums